"Raise 'Em Up" is a song written by Tom Douglas, Jaren Johnston and Jeffrey Steele and recorded by New Zealand-born Australian country music singer Keith Urban as a duet with American country music singer Eric Church. It was released in January 2015 as the fifth international single, sixth overall and final single from Urban's 2013 album Fuse.

Background
According to Urban, when he sent a demo to Church with the intent of having him serve as a duet partner on it, Church asked, "How do you write a song as good as that?" and Urban replied that he did not write the song. Regarding his own reaction to hearing the demo, Urban said that "I was floored" and added, "There’s so much imagery in the song and it’s written in such a way that you can fill in all the blanks. I love that kind of style of songwriting".

Content
The song is a mid-tempo country song speaking about various objects being "raise[d]" up, such as lighters at a concert, "raising one's voice", and raising children.

Critical reception
Billy Dukes of Taste of Country reviewed the single favorably, saying that "In barely three minutes, Urban’s new single from ‘Fuse’ goes from a wild weekend to raising kids, all while hinting at the preciousness of time. Rarely is so much said in so little time with so much efficiency and emotion."

The song was nominated for Best Country Duo/Group Performance at the 57th Annual Grammy Awards.

Chart performance
As of June 2015, the song has sold 250,000 copies in the US. On August 16, 2019, the single was certified gold by the Recording Industry Association of America (RIAA) for combined sales and streaming data of over 500,000 units in the United States.

Music video
The music video is in black-and-white, and was directed by Chris Hicky and premiered in April 2015.

Personnel
From Fuse liner notes.

 Nathan Chapman — programming, bass guitar, keyboards, background vocals
 Eric Church — lead vocals
 Keith Urban — all vocals, electric guitar, acoustic guitar

Charts

Weekly charts

Year-end charts

Certifications

References

2015 singles
Keith Urban songs
Eric Church songs
Black-and-white music videos
Capitol Records Nashville singles
Songs written by Tom Douglas (songwriter)
Songs written by Jaren Johnston
Songs written by Jeffrey Steele
Song recordings produced by Nathan Chapman (record producer)
2013 songs
Music videos directed by Chris Hicky
Country ballads
2010s ballads
Male vocal duets